Jacques Vandenhaute (3 September 1931 – 27 December 2014) was a Belgian politician from the Mouvement Réformateur who served as Senator from 1981 to 1995 and as MP from 1995 to 1999.

References

1931 births
2014 deaths
Members of the Senate (Belgium)
Reformist Movement politicians
21st-century Belgian politicians
People from Etterbeek